Nicholas Lander (born April 8, 1952 in Manchester, England) is a consultant to and writer on the restaurant industry.

He studied at Manchester Grammar School, Jesus College, Cambridge, and Manchester Business School before establishing himself as one of Britain's foremost restaurateurs in the 1980s with L'Escargot restaurant in Soho, London.

Since 1989 he has been the restaurant correspondent for the Financial Times, where his weekly columns, under the byline of 'The Restaurant Insider', have tried to look at themes and trends in the restaurant industry.

Lander has written a small number of books, including The Art of the Restaurateur (2012), an Economist Book of the Year, and Dinner for a Fiver (1994).

He is also a food service consultant to a selection of British arts organisations and companies.

He is a fanatical supporter of Manchester United and lists it under the 'clubs' section of his entry in Who's Who. He is married to Jancis Robinson.

He has been a food critic on BBC's MasterChef.

Bibliography

Books

Lander, Nicholas (2007). Crisis Cook Book : The Crisis Cook Book comprises 84 recipes from 28 top chefs.

Lander, Nicholas (2016). On the Menu: The World’s Favourite Piece of Paper.

Critical studies and reviews
 Review of The art of the restaurateur.

References

External links
 Nick Lander's website

1952 births
Living people
Writers from Manchester
People educated at Manchester Grammar School
Alumni of Jesus College, Cambridge
Alumni of the University of Manchester
Alumni of the Manchester Business School
British male journalists
British restaurant critics
English writers